Kumud Ranjan Mullick (1883–1970) was a Bengali writer and poet. He was a poet of the Tagore era of Bengali literature. He was an early mentor and coach to the poet Kazi Nazrul Islam.

Biography
He was born on 1 March 1883 in a Baidya family in a village named Kogram in Purba Bardhaman district of West Bengal, India. He graduated from the Scottish Church College of the University of Calcutta in 1905 and won the Bankimchandra Gold Medal. He started his teaching career at Mathrun Nabinchandra Vidyaytan in Purba Bardhaman where he later became the headmaster.

Kumud Ranjan's poetry was influenced by Vaishnavism. His poetry is also a portrait of rural Bengal. He was awarded the Jagattarini Gold Medal and the Padma Shri by the Government of India. He died on 14 December 1970.

Main works
 Shatadal
 Bantulsi
 Ujani
 Ektara
 Bithi
 Banamallika
 Rajanigandha
 Nupur
 Chunkali
 Tunir
 Ajay
 Swarna Sandhya
 Dwarabati
 Kuheli
 Mukhoser Dokan

Music Album
One memorable music album named Kumud Kabya Geeti was released by the Gramophone Co. of India, comprising some of his poems made into songs like 'Ajayer buke saradin', 'Ruper laagi jodi amaare  bhalobasho', 'Jhapsa hoye aaschhe kromey', 'Latar bedona' & many more beautiful poems set to music by famous Bengali musical icons like Hemanta Mukherjee, Anup Ghoshal, Haimanti Sukla, Tarun Bandopadhyay and many more.

List of Kumdud Kabya Geeti sung by various celebrated singers from Bengal:

 Ajayer Buke Saradin                                           sung by Anup Ghoshal
 Akashe Kalo Megher Mukhosh Pore                  sung by Alpana Sengupta 
 Dinpallir Metho Gaan                                          sung by Hemanta Mukhopadhyay
 Ruper Lagi Jodi Amare                                       sung by Haimanti Sukla
 Hoy To Amar E Pathe                                         sung by Haimanti Sukla
 Naiko Deri Chharbe Tori (With Recitation)         sung by Arundhati Holme Chowdhury, Recitation by Pt. Shankar Ghosh
 Mukul Jhare Mukul Jhare                                   sung by Alpana Sengupta
 Nidagher Chanpa Tumi                                      sung by Anup Ghoshal
 Bhabchhi Jakhan Jai Chole                               sung by Arundhati Holme Chowdhury

Famous Disciple
One of his students, at the Mathrun Navinchandra Vidyalay, Burdwan where Kumud Ranjan was the Headmaster, later rose to become Bengal's best known Rebel poet, Kazi Najrul Islam.

Awards
 Jagattarini Gold Medal of the University of Calcutta.
 Padma Shri by the Government of India in 1970.

References

1883 births
1970 deaths
Bengali Hindus
20th-century Bengalis
Bengali-language writers
Bengali male poets
20th-century Bengali poets
Bengali-language poets
People from Purba Bardhaman district
Scottish Church College alumni
University of Calcutta alumni
Recipients of the Padma Shri in literature & education
20th-century Indian poets
20th-century Indian writers
20th-century Indian male writers
People from West Bengal
Indian poets
Indian male poets
Poets from West Bengal
Indian male writers
Writers from West Bengal